The 2015–16 Omaha Mavericks men's basketball team represents the University of Nebraska Omaha during the 2015–16 NCAA Division I women's basketball season. The Mavericks, led by third year head coach Brittany Lange, play their home games at Baxter Arena and were members of The Summit League. They finished the season 15–15, 7–9 in Summit League play to finish in sixth place. They advanced to the semifinals of the Summit League women's tournament where they lost to South Dakota State.

Roster

Schedule

|-
! colspan="9" style="background:#000; color:#d71920;"| Exhibition

|-
! colspan="9" style="background:#000; color:#d71920;"| Non-conference regular season

|-
! colspan="9" style="background:#000; color:#d71920;"| The Summit League league play

|-
! colspan="9" style="background:#000; color:#d71920;"| The Summit League Women's Tournament

References

See also
2015–16 Omaha Mavericks men's basketball team

Omaha Mavericks women's basketball seasons
Omaha
2015 in sports in Nebraska
2016 in sports in Nebraska